Jenna Fesemyer (born January 31, 1997) is an American wheelchair racer. She won a gold and a silver medal at the 2019 Parapan American Games held in Lima, Peru. She also represented the United States at the 2020 Summer Paralympics in Tokyo, Japan.

In 2020, she won the bronze medal in the women's wheelchair race in the London Marathon held in London, United Kingdom.

Career 

She won the silver medal in the women's wheelchair race in the 2019 Los Angeles Marathon held in Los Angeles, United States. In the same year, she represented the United States at the 2019 Parapan American Games held in Lima, Peru and she won the gold medal in the women's 800 metres T54 event and the silver medal in the women's 400 metres T54 event. In November 2019, she finished in 7th place in the New York City Marathon held in New York City, United States. Fesemeyer came third at the delayed 2020 London Marathon.

At the 2020 Summer Paralympics in Tokyo, Japan, she finished in 7th place in the women's 5000 metres T54 event with a new personal best of 11:17.24. She also competed in the women's 1500 metres T54 and women's marathon T54 events.

Two months after the Paralympics, she competed in several wheelchair marathon races: she finished in third place in the women's wheelchair race at the 2021 Chicago Marathon and she also respectively finished in 9th and 6th place in this race at the 2021 London Marathon and 2021 Boston Marathon. She also finished in 4th place in the 2021 New York City Marathon.

Achievements

References

External links 

 

Living people
1997 births
American female wheelchair racers
Medalists at the 2019 Parapan American Games
Athletes (track and field) at the 2020 Summer Paralympics
Sportspeople from Akron, Ohio
Track and field athletes from Ohio
Paralympic track and field athletes of the United States
21st-century American women